Gorstan is a small hamlet in Garve, Ross-shire region in the Scottish council area of Highland.

References

Populated places in Ross and Cromarty